The All-NCHC Teams are composed of players at all positions from teams that are members of the National Collegiate Hockey Conference, an NCAA Division I hockey-only conference. Each year, beginning in 2013–14, at the conclusion of the NCHC regular season the head coaches and one student-athlete from each member team vote for players to be placed on each all-conference team. The all-NCHC teams are a successor to the All-CCHA Teams which were discontinued after the conference dissolved due to the 2013–14 NCAA conference realignment.

The all-conference teams are composed of one goaltender, two defensemen and three forwards. Players may only appear once per year on any of the first or second teams but freshman may appear on both the rookie team and one of the other all-conference teams.

All-conference teams

First Team

2010s

2020s

First Team players by school

Multiple appearances

Second Team

2010s

2020s

Second Team players by school

Multiple appearances

Rookie Team

2010s

2020s

Rookie Team players by school

See also
NCHC Awards
All-CCHA Teams
All-WCHA Teams

References

External links
NCHC All-Star Team
NCHC All-Conference Team
NCHC All-Rookie Team

National Collegiate Hockey Conference
List of NCHC